Flavivirus is a genus of positive-strand RNA viruses in the family Flaviviridae. The genus includes the West Nile virus, dengue virus, tick-borne encephalitis virus, yellow fever virus, Zika virus and several other viruses which may cause encephalitis, as well as insect-specific flaviviruses (ISFs) such as cell fusing agent virus (CFAV), Palm Creek virus (PCV), and Parramatta River virus (PaRV). While dual-host flaviviruses can infect vertebrates as well as arthropods, insect-specific flaviviruses are restricted to their competent arthropods. The means by which flaviviruses establish persistent infection in their competent vectors and cause disease in humans depends upon several virus-host interactions, including the intricate interplay between flavivirus-encoded immune antagonists and the host antiviral innate immune effector molecules.

Flaviviruses are named for the yellow fever virus; the word flavus means 'yellow' in Latin, and yellow fever in turn is named from its propensity to cause yellow jaundice in victims.

Flaviviruses share several common aspects: common size (40–65 nm), symmetry (enveloped, icosahedral nucleocapsid), nucleic acid (positive-sense, single-stranded RNA around 10,000–11,000 bases), and appearance under the electron microscope.

Most of these viruses are primarily transmitted by the bite from an infected arthropod (mosquito or tick), and hence are classified as arboviruses. Human infections with most of these arboviruses are incidental, as humans are unable to replicate the virus to high enough titers to reinfect the arthropods needed to continue the virus life-cycle – humans are then a dead end host. The exceptions to this are the yellow fever virus, dengue virus and zika virus. These three viruses still require mosquito vectors but are well-enough adapted to humans as to not necessarily depend upon animal hosts (although they continue to have important animal transmission routes, as well).

Other virus transmission routes for arboviruses include handling infected animal carcasses, blood transfusion, sex, childbirth and consumption of unpasteurised milk products. Transmission from nonhuman vertebrates to humans without an intermediate vector arthropod however mostly occurs with low probability. For example, early tests with yellow fever showed that the disease is not contagious.

The known non-arboviruses of the flavivirus family reproduce in either arthropods or vertebrates, but not both, with one odd member of the genus affecting a nematode.

Structure

Flaviviruses are enveloped and spherical and have icosahedral geometries with a pseudo T=3 symmetry. The virus particle diameter is around 50 nm.

Genome 
Flaviviruses have positive-sense, single-stranded RNA genomes which are non-segmented and around 10–11 kbp in length. In general, the genome encodes three structural proteins (Capsid, prM, and Envelope) and seven non-structural proteins (NS1, NS2A, NS2B, NS3, NS4A, NS4B, NS5). The genomic RNA is modified at the 5′ end of positive-strand genomic RNA with a cap-1 structure (me7-GpppA-me2).

Life cycle

Flaviviruses replicate in the cytoplasm of the host cells. The genome mimics the cellular mRNA molecule in all aspects except for the absence of the poly-adenylated (poly-A) tail. This feature allows the virus to exploit cellular apparatuses to synthesize both structural and non-structural proteins, during replication. The cellular ribosome is crucial to the replication of the flavivirus, as it translates the RNA, in a similar fashion to cellular mRNA, resulting in the synthesis of a single polyprotein.

Cellular RNA cap structures are formed via the action of an RNA triphosphatase, with guanylyltransferase, N7-methyltransferase and 2′-O methyltransferase. The virus encodes these activities in its non-structural proteins. The NS3 protein encodes a RNA triphosphatase within its helicase domain. It uses the helicase ATP hydrolysis site to remove the γ-phosphate from the 5′ end of the RNA. The N-terminal domain of the non-structural protein 5 (NS5) has both the N7-methyltransferase and guanylyltransferase activities necessary for forming mature RNA cap structures. RNA binding affinity is reduced by the presence of ATP or GTP and enhanced by S-adenosyl methionine. This protein also encodes a 2′-O methyltransferase.

Once translated, the polyprotein is cleaved by a combination of viral and host proteases to release mature polypeptide products. Nevertheless, cellular post-translational modification is dependent on the presence of a poly-A tail; therefore this process is not host-dependent. Instead, the poly-protein contains an autocatalytic feature which automatically releases the first peptide, a virus specific enzyme. This enzyme is then able to cleave the remaining poly-protein into the individual products. One of the products cleaved is a RNA-dependent RNA polymerase, responsible for the synthesis of a negative-sense RNA molecule. Consequently, this molecule acts as the template for the synthesis of the genomic progeny RNA.

Flavivirus genomic RNA replication occurs on rough endoplasmic reticulum membranes in membranous compartments. New viral particles are subsequently assembled. This occurs during the budding process which is also responsible for the accumulation of the envelope and cell lysis.

A G protein-coupled receptor kinase 2 (also known as ADRBK1) appears to be important in entry and replication for several viruses in Flaviviridae.

Humans, mammals, mosquitoes, and ticks serve as the natural host. Transmission routes are zoonosis and bite.

RNA secondary structure elements

The positive sense RNA genome of Flavivirus contains 5' and 3' untranslated regions (UTRs).

5'UTR

The 5'UTRs are 95–101 nucleotides long in Dengue virus. There are two conserved structural elements in the Flavivirus 5'UTR, a large stem loop (SLA) and a short stem loop (SLB). SLA folds into a Y-shaped structure with a side stem loop and a small top loop. SLA is likely to act as a promoter, and is essential for viral RNA synthesis. SLB is involved in interactions between the 5'UTR and 3'UTR which result in the cyclisation of the viral RNA, which is essential for viral replication.

3'UTR

The 3'UTRs are typically 0.3–0.5 kb in length and contain a number of highly conserved secondary structures which are conserved and restricted to the flavivirus family. The majority of analysis has been carried out using West Nile virus (WNV) to study the function the 3'UTR.

Currently 8 secondary structures have been identified within the 3'UTR of WNV and are (in the order in which they are found with the 3'UTR)  SL-I, SL-II, SL-III, SL-IV, DB1, DB2 and CRE. Some of these secondary structures have been characterised and are important in facilitating viral replication and protecting the 3'UTR from 5' endonuclease digestion. Nuclease resistance protects the downstream 3' UTR RNA fragment from degradation and is essential for virus-induced cytopathicity and pathogenicity.

 SL-II

SL-II has been suggested to contribute to nuclease resistance. It may be related to another hairpin loop identified in the 5'UTR of the Japanese encephalitis virus (JEV) genome. The JEV hairpin is significantly over-represented upon host cell infection and it has been suggested that the hairpin structure may play a role in regulating RNA synthesis.

SL-IV

This secondary structure is located within the 3'UTR of the genome of Flavivirus upstream of the DB elements. The function of this conserved structure is unknown but is thought to contribute to ribonuclease resistance.

 DB1/DB2
These two conserved secondary structures are also known as pseudo-repeat elements. They were originally identified within the genome of Dengue virus and are found adjacent to each other within the 3'UTR. They appear to be widely conserved across the Flaviviradae. These DB elements have a secondary structure consisting of three helices and they play a role in ensuring efficient translation. Deletion of DB1 has a small but significant reduction in translation but deletion of DB2 has little effect. Deleting both DB1 and DB2 reduced translation efficiency of the viral genome to 25%.

CRE

CRE is the Cis-acting replication element, also known as the 3'SL RNA elements, and is thought to be essential in viral replication by facilitating the formation of a "replication complex". Although evidence has been presented for an existence of a pseudoknot structure in this RNA, it does not appear to be well conserved across flaviviruses. Deletions of the 3' UTR of flaviviruses have been shown to be lethal for infectious clones.

Conserved hairpin cHP
A conserved hairpin (cHP) structure was later found in several Flavivirus genomes and is thought to direct translation of capsid proteins. It is located just downstream of the AUG start codon.

The role of RNA secondary structures in sfRNA production 

Subgenomic flavivirus RNA (sfRNA) is an extension of the 3' UTR and has been demonstrated to play a role in flavivirus replication and pathogenesis. sfRNA is produced by incomplete degradation of genomic viral RNA by the host cells 5'-3' exoribonuclease 1 (XRN1). As the XRN1 degrades viral RNA, it stalls at stemloops formed by the secondary structure of the 5' and 3' UTR. This pause results in an undigested fragment of genome RNA known as sfRNA. sfRNA influences the life cycle of the flavivirus in a concentration dependent manner. Accumulation of sfRNA causes (1) antagonization of the cell's innate immune response, thus decreasing host defense against the virus (2) inhibition of XRN1 and Dicer activity to modify RNAi pathways that destroy viral RNA (3) modification of the viral replication complex to increase viral reproduction. Overall, sfRNA is implied in multiple pathways that compromise host defenses and promote infection by flaviviruses.

Evolution 

The flaviviruses can be divided into two clades: one with vector-borne viruses and the other with no known vector. The vector clade, in turn, can be subdivided into a mosquito-borne clade and a tick-borne clade. These groups can be divided again.

The mosquito group can be divided into two branches: one branch contains neurotropic viruses, often associated with encephalitic disease in humans or livestock. This branch tends to be spread by Culex species and to have bird reservoirs. The second branch is the non-neurotropic viruses associated with human haemorrhagic disease. These tend to have Aedes species as vectors and primate hosts.

The tick-borne viruses also form two distinct groups: one is associated with seabirds and the other – the tick-borne encephalitis complex viruses – is associated primarily with rodents.

The viruses that lack a known vector can be divided into three groups: one closely related to the mosquito-borne viruses, which is associated with bats; a second, genetically more distant, is also associated with bats; and a third group is associated with rodents.

Evolutionary relationships between endogenised viral elements of Flaviviruses and contemporary flaviviruses using maximum likelihood approaches have identified that arthropod-vectored flaviviruses likely emerged from an arachnid source. This contradicts earlier work with a smaller number of extant viruses showing that the tick-borne viruses emerged from a mosquito-borne group.

Several partial and complete genomes of flaviviruses have been found in aquatic invertebrates such as the sea spider Endeis spinosa and several crustaceans and cephalopods. These sequences appear to be related to those in the insect-specific flaviviruses and also the Tamana bat virus groupings. While it is not presently clear how aquatic flaviviruses fit into the evolution of this group of viruses, there is some evidence that one of these viruses, Wenzhou shark flavivirus, infects both a crustacean (Portunus trituberculatus) Pacific spadenose shark (Scoliodon macrorhynchos) shark host, indicating an aquatic arbovirus life cycle.

Estimates of divergence times have been made for several of these viruses. The origin of these viruses appears to be at least 9400 to 14,000 years ago. The Old World and New World dengue strains diverged between 150 and 450 years ago. The European and Far Eastern tick-borne encephalitis strains diverged about 1087 (1610–649) years ago. European tick-borne encephalitis and louping ill viruses diverged about 572 (844–328) years ago. This latter estimate is consistent with historical records. Kunjin virus diverged from West Nile virus approximately 277 (475–137) years ago. This time corresponds to the settlement of Australia from Europe. The Japanese encephalitis group appears to have evolved in Africa 2000–3000 years ago and then spread initially to South East Asia before migrating to the rest of Asia.

Phylogenetic studies of the West Nile virus has shown that it emerged as a distinct virus around 1000 years ago. This initial virus developed into two distinct lineages, lineage 1 and its multiple profiles is the source of the epidemic transmission in Africa and throughout the world. Lineage 2 was considered an Africa zoonosis. However, in 2008, lineage 2, previously only seen in horses in sub-Saharan Africa and Madagascar, began to appear in horses in Europe, where the first known outbreak affected 18 animals in Hungary in 2008. Lineage 1 West Nile virus was detected in South Africa in 2010 in a mare and her aborted fetus; previously, only lineage 2 West Nile virus had been detected in horses and humans in South Africa.  A 2007 fatal case in a killer whale in Texas broadened the known host range of West Nile virus to include cetaceans.

Omsk haemorrhagic fever virus appears to have evolved within the last 1000 years. The viral genomes can be divided into 2 clades — A and B. Clade A has five genotypes, and clade B has one. These clades separated about 700 years ago. This separation appears to have occurred in the Kurgan province. Clade A subsequently underwent division into clade C, D and E 230 years ago. Clade C and E appear to have originated in the Novosibirsk and Omsk Provinces, respectively. The muskrat Ondatra zibethicus, which is highly susceptible to this virus, was introduced into this area in the 1930s.

Taxonomy

Species 
In the genus Flavivirus there are 53 defined species:

Sorted by vector

Vaccines

The very successful yellow fever 17D vaccine, introduced in 1937, produced dramatic reductions in epidemic activity.

Effective inactivated Japanese encephalitis and Tick-borne encephalitis vaccines were introduced in the middle of the 20th century. Unacceptable adverse events have prompted change from a mouse-brain inactivated Japanese encephalitis vaccine to safer and more effective second generation Japanese encephalitis vaccines. These may come into wide use to effectively prevent this severe disease in the huge populations of Asia—North, South and Southeast.

The dengue viruses produce many millions of infections annually due to transmission by a successful global mosquito vector. As mosquito control has failed, several dengue vaccines are in varying stages of development. CYD-TDV, sold under the trade name Dengvaxia, is a tetravalent chimeric vaccine that splices structural genes of the four dengue viruses onto a 17D yellow fever backbone. Dengvaxia is approved in five countries.

References

Further reading

External links
MicrobiologyBytes: Flaviviruses
Novartis Institute for Tropical Diseases (NITD) – Dengue Fever research at the Novartis Institute for Tropical Diseases (NITD)
Dengueinfo.org – Depository of dengue virus genomic sequence data
 Viralzone: Flavivirus
Virus Pathogen Database and Analysis Resource (ViPR): Flaviviridae
Rfam entry for Flavivirus 3'UTR stem loop IV
Rfam entry for Flavivirus DB element
Rfam entry for Flavivirus 3' UTR cis-acting replication element (CRE)
Rfam entry for the Japanese encephalitis virus (JEV) hairpin structure

 
Rodent-carried diseases
Flaviviridae
Virus genera